Lav Agarwal (born 18 February 1972) is an Indian bureaucrat and  He is an IAS officer in the Ministry of Health and Family Welfare, serving as an Additional Secretary. He served as a Joint Secretary till August 2022. Before his appointment to the Health Ministry in 2016, Agarwal served in various state governments. He is regarded as the face of Government of India's fight against COVID-19 due to his media briefings before the Press Information Bureau in the National Media Centre on a daily basis. On 24 August 2020, Agarwal recovered from COVID-19 after being diagnosed with the same on 14 August 2020.

References

External links

1972 births
Living people
IIT Delhi alumni
People from Saharanpur district
Indian Administrative Service officers